Statistics of League of Ireland in the 1981-82 season.

Overview
It was contested by 16 teams, and Dundalk won the championship.  This season used a trial point system with 4 for an away win, 3 for a home win, 2 for an away draw, 1 for a home draw.

Final classification

Results

Top scorers

Ireland, 1981-82
1981–82 in Republic of Ireland association football
League of Ireland seasons